Ann Majchrzak is an American academic. She is a Professor of Digital Innovation in the 
Department of Data Sciences and Operations within the USC Marshall School of Business. Majchrzak holds the USC Associates Chair in Business Administration.

Awards 
 Association for Information Systems Fellow Award 2013 in recognition of her outstanding contributions to the information systems discipline in the areas of research, teaching and service 
Lifetime Service Award, Organizational Communication and Information Systems Division, Academy of Management lifetime service award, 2015
Shaoul Foundation Research Fellow, The Mortimer and Rayner Sackler Institute of Advanced Studies, Tel Aviv University, 2016
Medal of Excellence, Portland International Center for Management of Engineering and Technology 2019
 Best Paper Award 2000, Management Information Systems Quarterly, Majchrzak, A., Rice, R.E., Malhotra, A, King, N., Ba, S. (2000) Technology adaptation: the case of a computer-supported inter-organizational virtual team. MIS Quarterly, 24 (4), 569–600.

Career and research
Majchrzak has held visiting appointments and/or fellowships at ESADE Business School, University Ramon Llull (Barcelona, Spain), Vrije Universiteit Amsterdam, LUISS Business School (Rome, Italy), and Simon Fraser University (Vancouver Canada) in the areas of Innovation and Organization.

Throughout her career she has served in editorial roles for the field's top journals. As examples, she served as a senior editor for Organization Science from 2004 to 2020 and Management Information Systems Quarterly from 2011 to 2014.

In 2020, she published the book, Unleashing the Crowd: Collaborative Solutions to Wicked Business Solutions and Societal Problems, with co-author, Arvind Malhotra.

Selected Publications 

 Majchrzak, A., Rice, R. E., Malhotra, A., King, N., & Ba, S. (2000). Technology adaptation: The case of a computer-supported inter-organizational virtual team. MIS quarterly, 569-600. 
 Majchrzak, A., Faraj, S., Kane, G. C., & Azad, B. (2013). The contradictory influence of social media affordances on online communal knowledge sharing. Journal of Computer-Mediated Communication, 19(1), 38-55. https://doi.org/10.1111/jcc4.12030
 Majchrzak, A., Cooper, L. P., & Neece, O. E. (2004). Knowledge reuse for innovation. Management science, 50(2), 174-188. https://doi.org/10.1287/mnsc.1030.0116

References

External links
 

University of Southern California faculty
University of Paris alumni
Pitzer College alumni
University of California, Los Angeles alumni
American women academics
Year of birth missing (living people)
Living people
21st-century American women